is a former Japanese football player.

Playing career
Komatsuzaki was born in Chiba Prefecture on July 10, 1970. After graduating from Juntendo University, he joined the Japan Football League club Fujitsu (later Kawasaki Frontale) in 1993. He played many matches as center back during his first season. However, he did not play as much in 1997. Although the club was promoted to the J2 League in 1999, he was not put into play.  In 2000, he moved to the J2 club Consadole Sapporo. However he did not play much. In 2001, he moved to the newly promoted J2 League club, Yokohama FC. Although he played often as a center back in 2001, he was not played in 2002 and retired at the end of the 2002 season.

Club statistics

References

External links

1970 births
Living people
Juntendo University alumni
Association football people from Chiba Prefecture
Japanese footballers
J2 League players
Japan Football League (1992–1998) players
Kawasaki Frontale players
Hokkaido Consadole Sapporo players
Yokohama FC players
Association football defenders